The Justicialist Party (abbr. PJ) is a major political party in Argentina, and the largest branch within Peronism.

Current president Alberto Fernández belongs to the Justicialist Party (and has, since 2021, served as its chairman), as well as former presidents Juan Perón, Héctor Cámpora, Raúl Alberto Lastiri, Isabel Perón, Carlos Menem, Ramón Puerta, Adolfo Rodríguez Saá, Eduardo Camaño, Eduardo Duhalde, Néstor Kirchner, and Cristina Fernández de Kirchner. Justicialists have been the largest party in Congress almost consistently since 1987.

Founded by Juan Perón, it was previously called the Peronist Party after its founder. It is overall the largest party in Congress; however, this does not reflect the divisions within the party over the role of Kirchnerism, the left-wing populist faction of the party, which is opposed by the dissident Peronists (also known as Federal Peronism or Menemism), the conservative faction of the party.

History

Overview 
The Justicialist Party was founded in 1946 by Juan and Eva Perón, uniting the Labour Party, the Radical Civic Union Renewal Board and the Independent Party, the three parties that had supported Peron in the election. After the enactment of women's suffrage, the Female Peronist Party, led by the First Lady, was also established. All Peronist entities were banned from elections after 1955, when the Revolución Libertadora overthrew Perón, and civilian governments' attempt to lift Peronism's ban from legislative and local elections in 1962 and 1965 resulted in military coups.
 
Basing itself on the policies espoused by Perón as Argentine president, the party's platform has from its inception centered on populism, and its most consistent base of support has historically been the General Confederation of Labor, Argentina's largest trade union. Perón ordered the mass nationalization of public services, strategic industries, and the critical farm export sector; enacted progressive labor laws and social reforms; and accelerated public works investment.

His tenure also favored technical schools, harassed university staff, and promoted urbanization as it raised taxes on the agrarian sector. Those trends earned Peronism the loyalty of much of the working and lower classes but helped alienate the upper and middle classes of society. Censorship and repression intensified, and following his loss of support from the influential Argentine Catholic Church, Perón was ultimately deposed in a violent 1955 coup.

The alignment of groups as supporting or opposing Peronism has largely endured, but the policies of Peronism itself varied greatly over the subsequent decades, as did increasingly those put forth by its many competing figures. During Perón's exile, it became a big tent party united almost solely by its support for the aging leader's return. A series of violent incidents, as well as Perón's negotiations with both the military regime and diverse political factions, helped lead to his return to Argentina in 1973 and to his election in September that year.

An impasse followed in which the party had a place both for leftist armed organizations such as Montoneros, and far-right factions such as José López Rega's Argentine Anti-Communist Alliance. Following Perón's death in 1974, however, the tenuous understanding disintegrated, and a wave of political violence ensued, ultimately resulting in the March 1976 coup. The Dirty War of the late 1970s, which cost hundreds of Peronists (among thousands more) their lives, solidified the party's populist outlook, particularly following the failure of conservative Economy Minister José Alfredo Martínez de Hoz's free trade and deregulatory policies after 1980.

In the first democratic elections after the end of the dictatorship of the National Reorganization Process, in 1983, the Justicialist Party lost to the Radical Civic Union (UCR). Six years later, it returned to power with Carlos Menem, during whose term the Constitution was reformed to allow for presidential reelection. Menem (1989–1999) adopted neoliberal right-wing policies which changed the overall image of the party.

The Justicialist Party was defeated by a coalition formed by the UCR and the centre-left FrePaSo (itself a left-wing offshoot of the PJ) in 1999, but regained political weight in the 2001 legislative elections, and was ultimately left in charge of managing the selection of an interim president after the economic collapse of December 2001. Justicialist Eduardo Duhalde, chosen by Congress, ruled during 2002 and part of 2003.

The 2003 elections saw the constituency of the party split in three, as Carlos Menem, Néstor Kirchner (backed by Duhalde) and Adolfo Rodríguez Saá ran for the presidency leading different party coalitions. After Kirchner's victory, the party started to align behind his leadership, moving slightly to the left.

The Justicialist Party effectively broke apart in the 2005 legislative elections when two factions ran for a Senate seat in Buenos Aires Province: Cristina Fernández de Kirchner (then the First Lady) and Hilda González de Duhalde (wife of former president Duhalde). The campaign was particularly vicious. Kirchner's side allied with other minor forces and presented itself as a heterodox, left-leaning Front for Victory (FpV), while Duhalde's side stuck to older Peronist tradition. González de Duhalde's defeat to her opponent marked, according to many political analysts, the end to Duhalde's dominance over the province, and was followed by a steady defection of his supporters to the winner's side.

Néstor Kirchner proposed the entry of the party into the Socialist International in February 2008. His dominance of the party was undermined, however, by the 2008 Argentine government conflict with the agricultural sector, when a bill raising export taxes was introduced with presidential support. Subsequent growers' lockouts helped result in the defection of numerous Peronists from the FpV caucus, and further losses during the 2009 mid-term elections resulted in the loss of the FpV absolute majorities in both houses of Congress.

In 2015, the PJ, with its presidential candidate Daniel Scioli, was defeated by the Cambiemos coalition. Mauricio Macri was inaugurated as President of Argentina, ending 12 years of Kirchnerism.

However, in the elections of 2019, the PJ joined the Frente de Todos, which won the presidential elections. The PJ returned to power, with Alberto Fernández as President of the nation. On 10 December 2019, the Centre-left Alberto Fernández of the Justicialist Party was inaugurated president, after defeating the incumbent Mauricio Macri in the 2019 Argentine general election.

Beginning 
The Justicialist party was created in November 1946, 10 months after Juan D. Perón was elected president of the nation, with the name Single Revolutionary party; previously this would be called the Peronist party. The party was a result of the fusion of three parties that had been created in 1945 in order to sustain the presidential candidacy of Perón: the Labor party, the Radical Renovating Together Civic Union, and the Independent party.

Peronism 

Peronism is a political current that was established between November 1943 and October 1945, as a result of an alliance between a large number of unions, principally of socialist and revolutionary union ideology, and two soldiers – Juan Domingo Perón and Domingo Mercante, whose initial objective was to run the National Labor Department – later elevated to the level of Secretary of Labor and Social Security – and to drive until there were laws and measures for the worker's benefit. The Secretary was run by Perón, who in the course of those years was converted into the leader of a new political movement that would take the name Peronism in the course of 1945.

In those years the country was governed since 1943 by a military dictatorship self-designated as the Revolution of ‘43, made of a very heterogeneous composition, that had overthrown at its time a fraudulent regime, known as the Infamous Decade. At the start of 1945, the US ambassador to Argentina, Spruille Braden, organized a broad movement that was defined as anti-peronist, with the goal of opposing Perón and the sanctioned labor laws. Largely as a reaction to the union movement, principally the socialist and revolutionary union majority started to define themselves as peronists.

On October 8, 1945, at the loss of the vote from the officials of Campo de Mayo, Perón renounced, being later detained. Nine days later, a big worker mobilization known as Loyalty Day, compelled the military government to prepare Perón’s liberation and call elections. That day is the most cited as the date of peronism’s birth.

Party Organization until 1955 
Many union leaders opposed him, but their political inexperience and Perón’s charisma before the masses made them unsuccessful. Lewinsky characterizes the Peronist party (PP) as a popular party that will differ from other European, union based parties in four aspects.

The first of them is that they had been created from above by agents of the State, destined to retain power more than to obtain it; operated in major part by their own government using State resources whereas PP never developed their own organization. The second is that they were an extremely personalist party that in the statutes of 1954 declared Perón is their “Supreme Leader” and gave him the authority to “modify or declare null and void the decision of the party authorities… to inspect, intervene, and replace” the leaders of the party and even prohibited party headquarters from displaying photographs that were not Perón or Eva Perón. The national party management intervened in permanent form in the provincial subsidiaries and used to choose the local candidates. Usually the leaders with independent support were displaced and replaced by those “loyal to the death” that followed Perón's directives exclusively. In this form, the political career inside the party depended exclusively on the bonds with Perón; there was not a structure for political promotion nor a stable bureaucratic hierarchy. For example, the reorganization of the party in 1947 signified the replacement of the entirety of the highest party leadership members.

Third, the party had a fluid structure that was maintained until the final days of the decade of 1940. In 1951, Perón once again reorganized the party structure creating a parallel hierarchy with a “strategic national command” and provincial “tactical commands” that would have representatives of the three party branches – masculine, feminine, and union – but in practice Perón and Eva Perón exercised strategic leadership, and the governors and “inventors” arrived ahead of the tactics. Lastly, differently from the English Labor party, the PP did not initially have rules about their relation with the unions. In the decade of 1950, the union was recognized as one of the three branches and, as such, was attributed to them by tradition – without a written norm – a right to a third of the candidacies, but until 1955 it was not complied with rigor.

Ideology
From its foundation, the Justicialist Party has been a Peronist catch-all party, which focuses on the figure of Juan Perón and his wife, Eva, with economic populist ideals.

From the return of Perón in 1973 and under the leadership of Isabel Perón, the Justicialist Party was no longer characterized by anti-imperialist and revolutionary tones but by a strong focus on orthodox peronist and anticommunism (of which it became the main bulwark in South America) and the support of economic liberalism.

That line continued even after the military dictatorship of the National Reorganization Process, with the government of Carlos Menem until that of Eduardo Duhalde. The party moved from being a Tercera Posición ("Third Position") to a centre-right party, while rival Radical Civic Union acted as a centre-left party.

Since 2003, the party has undergone an abrupt revolution, with the rise of a faction known as the Front for Victory, led by Néstor Kirchner. The policies and ideology of that faction were dubbed Kirchnerism, a mix of socialism, left-wing nationalism and radicalism. Kirchner was elected President of Argentina and soon became a popular left-wing figure. The party shifted to being left-wing populist, while the Radical Civic Union joined with other anti-Kirchnerist centrist and center-right parties including Republican Proposal. After his death in 2010, his wife, Cristina Fernández de Kirchner, took over the leadership of the Front for Victory, which continues to be a major faction of the Justicialist Party.

Leaders
The party is headed by a National Committee, whose president is the de facto leader of the party.
 1946–1974: Juan Perón (President: 1946–1955, 1973–1974)
 1974–1985: Isabel Perón (President: 1974–1976)
 1985–1990: Antonio Cafiero
 1990–2001: Carlos Menem (President: 1989–1999)
 2001: Rubén Marín (interim)
 2001–2003: Carlos Menem
 2003–2004: Eduardo Fellner
 2004–2005: (No leader)
 2005–2008: Ramón Ruiz
 2008–2009: Néstor Kirchner (President: 2003–2007)
 2009: Daniel Scioli (interim)
 2009–2010: Néstor Kirchner
 2010–2014: Daniel Scioli (interim)
 2016–2018: José Luis Gioja
 2018: Luis Barrionuevo (judicial controller)
 2018–2021: José Luis Gioja
 2021–present: Alberto Fernández (President: 2019–present)

Electoral history

Presidential elections

Congressional elections

Chamber of Deputies

Senate elections

References

External links
 

 
1946 establishments in Argentina
Center-left parties in Argentina
Social democratic parties in Argentina
Christian democratic parties in Argentina
Kirchnerism
Left-wing nationalist parties
Peronist parties and alliances in Argentina
Political parties established in 1946
Political parties in Argentina
Syncretic political movements
Third Position
Centre-right parties
Formerly banned political parties